Wheeler R. Baker is a former member of the Maryland House of Delegates, serving District 36, which covers Caroline, Cecil, Kent, and Queen Anne's Counties.  Mr. Baker is known for his colorful home-spun language.  He is quoted as saying such things as "I just feel like I can carry the water pail better than he can." and "I tell people we need to knock the dents out from the inside."

Education
Delegate Baker graduated from Centreville High School in Queen Anne's County, MD on the Eastern Shore of Maryland.  Later he attended Chesapeake College.

Career
After high school, Delegate Baker joined the United States Air Force and served from 1964 until 1968.  After his stint in the military, Baker ran his own business.

Delegate Baker has long been involved with Eastern Shore organizations.  Prior to being elected to the House of Delegates, Baker was elected to the board of County Commissioners for Queen Anne's County, a position he held from 1986 until 1990.  Before that he was a member of the Queen Anne's County Democratic Central Committee  from 1974 until 1978.  He was a member of the Chesapeake Bay Trust  from 1995 until 2001.  Additionally, he served on the Governor's Task Force on Eastern Shore Economic Development  from 1999 until 2001, the Task Force to Study the  Maryland Agricultural Land Preservation Foundation  from 2000 until 2001, the Mid-Shore Regional Council from 2001 until 2003, and finally the Tri-County Council for the Lower Eastern Shore of Maryland .

While a member of the Maryland House of Delegates, Wheeler Baker served on several committees including: the Appropriations Committee from 1995 until 2003, and several subcommittees.  He was the chair of the Queen Anne's County Delegation from 1995 until 2003.

Since being defeated for reelection in 2002, Baker has run for reelection (in 2006), but has stayed involved in Eastern Shore politics.  He is a current member of the Kent Narrows Development Foundation, an organization sponsors community activities on Kent Island in Queen Anne's County.  He currently owns Baker Liquor Store and Deli in Chester, Maryland.

Election results 
2006 Race for Maryland House of Delegates – District 36 Queen Anne's County
Voters to choose one per county:
{| class="wikitable"
!Name
!Votes
!Percent
!Outcome
|-
|- 
|Richard Sossi, Rep.
|19,450
|  53.4%
|   Won
|-
|-
|Wheeler R. Baker, Dem.
|16,950
|  46.6%
|   Lost
|-
|}

2002 Race for Maryland House of Delegates – District 36
Voters to choose three:
{| class="wikitable"
!Name
!Votes
!Percent
!Outcome
|-
|- 
|Richard Sossi, Rep.
|19,098
|  19.0%
|   Won
|-
|-
|Michael D. Smigiel, Sr., Rep.
|19,216
|  19.1%
|   Won
|-
|-
|Mary Roe Walkup, Rep.
|28,230
|  28.0%
|   Won
|-
|-
|Wheeler R. Baker, Dem.
|17,575
|  17.5%
|   Lost
|-
|-
|James G. Crouse, Dem.
|16,329
|  16.2%
|   Lost
|-
|Other Write-Ins
|277
|  0.3%
|   
|}

1998 Race for Maryland House of Delegates – District 36 Queen Anne's County
Voters to choose one per county:
{| class="wikitable"
!Name
!Votes
!Percent
!Outcome
|-
|- 
|Wheeler R. Baker, Dem.
|17,109
|  55%
|   Won
|-
|-
|Richard Sossi, Rep.
|13,807
|  45%
|   Lost
|-
|}

1994 Race for Maryland House of Delegates – District 36
Voters to choose three:
{| class="wikitable"
!Name
!Votes
!Percent
!Outcome
|-
|-
|Ronald A. Guns, Dem.
|14,915
|  20%
|   Won
|-
|-
|Wheeler R. Baker, Dem.
|13,911
|  18%
|   Won
|-
|- 
|Mary Roe Walkup, Rep.
|13,589
|  18%
|   Won
|-
|-
|W. Michael Newnam, Rep.
|11,874
|  16%
|   Lost
|-
|-
|Sharon Maenner Carrick, Rep.
|11,350
|  15%
|   Lost
|-
|-
|Allaire D. Williams, Rep.
|10,796
|  14%
|   Lost
|}

References and notes

External links
 http://www.msa.md.gov/msa/mdmanual/06hse/former/html/msa12181.html
 http://www.vote-usa.org/Intro.aspx?Id=MDBakerWheelerR

1946 births
Living people
Republican Party members of the Maryland House of Delegates
People from Easton, Maryland
People from Centreville, Maryland